Ume Sámi is a Sámi language spoken in Sweden and formerly in Norway. It is a moribund language with an estimated 100 speakers. It was spoken mainly along the Ume River in the south of present-day Arjeplog, in Sorsele and in Arvidsjaur.

Dialects
The best-known variety of Ume Sami is that of one Lars Sjulsson (born 1871) from Setsele, close to Malå, whose idiolect was documented by W. Schlachter in a 1958 dictionary and subsequent work. Dialect variation exists within the Ume Sami area, however. A main division is between more (north)western dialects such as those of Maskaure, Tärna and Ullisjaure (typically agreeing with Southern Sami), versus more (south)eastern dialects such as those of Malå, Malmesjaure and Mausjaure (typically agreeing with Pite Sami).

Phonology

Consonants

When a  sound occurs before a plosive or an affricate sound, they are then realized as preaspirated sounds. If an  sound occurs before a  sound, it is realized as a palatal lateral  sound. Some western dialects of the language lack the  phoneme.

Vowels

A schwa sound  may exist as an allophone of various vowel sounds.

Writing system

Until 2010, Ume Sámi did not have an official written standard, although it was the first Sámi language to be written extensively (because a private Christian school for Sámi children started in Lycksele 1632, where Ume Sámi was spoken). The New Testament was published in Ume Sámi in 1755 and the first Bible in Sámi was also published in Ume Sámi, in 1811.

The current official orthography is maintained by the Working Group for Ume Sámi, whose most recent recommendation was published in 2016.

Shortcomings:
In reference works, the length is indicated by a macron. In older orthographies, length could be indicated by writing a double vowel.
No distinction is made between long and overlong consonants, both being written with a double consonant letter. In reference works, the overlong stops are indicated with a vertical line (etc.)

Grammar

Consonant gradation
Unlike its southern neighbor Southern Sámi, Ume Sámi has consonant gradation. However, gradation is more limited than it is in the more northern Sami languages, because it does not occur in the case of short vowels followed by a consonant that can gradate to quantity 1 (that is, Proto-Samic single consonants or geminates). In these cases, only quantity 3 appears. Consonant clusters can gradate regardless of the preceding vowel.

Cases 
Ume Sámi has 8 cases:

 Nominative
 Accusative
 Genitive
 Illative
 Inessive
 Elative
 Comitative
 Essive

Pronouns

Verbs

Persons and numbers
The verbs in Ume Sámi have three persons, first, second and third. There are three grammatical numbers: singular, dual and plural.

Mood 
Ume Sámi has two grammatical moods: indicative and imperative

Tense

Negative verb
Ume Sámi, like Finnish, the other Sámi languages, and Estonian, has a negative verb. In Ume Sámi, the negative verb conjugates according to mood (indicative and imperative), person (1st, 2nd and 3rd) and number (singular, dual and plural).

Example

See also
Sámi people

References

External links

 Sámi lottit Names of birds found in Sápmi in a number of languages, including Skolt Sámi and English. Search function only works with Finnish input though.

Languages of Norway
Languages of Sweden
Sámi in Norway
Sámi in Sweden
Western Sámi languages
Endangered Uralic languages
Endangered languages of Europe